Dr. Steve-O is an American reality television series starring Steve-O, Trishelle Cannatella, and Reggie Pace. The show premiered on October 1, 2007; it aired Monday nights at 11:05 pm Eastern/10:05 pm Central, immediately after WWE Raw, on the USA Network. The show ended on November 12, 2007.

Plot 

Dr. Steve-O was a reality TV show where Steve-O acts as a doctor, to help males overcome their fears, thus the headline created by Steve-O, "Turning wussies into men." In every episode, Dr. Steve-O helps three different men, and makes them complete three challenges to overcome their fears.

Format 

The show begins with Dr. Steve-O riding in a customized ambulance along with his driver (Reggie) and nurse (Trishelle), showing the viewers videos sent in by men who want to overcome their fear. They then go to the subject's home and complete the first challenge, then they pick them up and go to another location for another challenge. Dr. Steve-O follows a checklist for the overcoming of a wussy's fears.

If someone decides that a challenge is too embarrassing for them, they can simply walk away and risk being called a "wuss". People who complete the process are awarded clean bills of health by Steve-O, who usually staples them onto the recipients.

List of episodes

 Note: In the scores column, the results are listed as "task:status".
 1 = Initiation Treatment
 2 = Personal Procedure
 3 = Group Therapy
 P = Passed
 F = Failed

Episode 1

 Aired: October 1, 2007
 Group Therapy: Butt Glide on Ice in Briefs with Sneaux Shoes While Hanging from a Zamboni.
 Special Guest(s): Ryan Simonetti, pro skateboarder

Episode 2

 Aired: October 8, 2007
 Group Therapy: Walk on Broken Glass and Swallow Goldfish.
 Special Guest(s): None

Episode 3

 Aired: October 15, 2007
 Group Therapy: "Fart Art"
 Special Guest(s): None

Episode 4

 Aired: October 22, 2007
 Group Therapy: Make Tea Cups out of Testicle Molds.
 Special Guest(s): Marcelle*, 61, Claudia*, 63 and Samantha**, virgin stripper

Episode 5

 Aired: October 29, 2007
 Group Therapy: Walk the Streets Naked.
 Special Guest(s): Ryan Simonetti, pro skateboarder and Kim Kardashian*, socialite, model and actress

Episode 6

 Aired: November 5, 2007
 Group Therapy: Push the "Skatemobile", designed by Dr. Steve-O and by Ryan Simonetti.
 Special Guest(s): Ryan Simonetti, pro skateboarder

Episode 7

 Aired: November 12, 2007
 Note: Originally the pilot episode.
 Group Therapy: None
 Special Guest(s): Brian*, bully

References

External links 
 Dr. Steve-O Official website (archived)
 Dr. Steve-O at USA Network (archived)
 

2007 American television series debuts
2007 American television series endings
2000s American reality television series
English-language television shows
Television series by Bunim/Murray Productions
USA Network original programming
Jackass (TV series)